Deceiver, Deceivers, The Deceiver or The Deceivers may refer to:

Books
Deceiver (novel), a 2010 novel by C. J. Cherryh
The Deceiver (novel), a novel by Frederick Forsyth
The Deceivers (Aiello novel), a 1999 novel by Robert Aiello
The Deceivers (Bester novel), a 1981 novel by Alfred Bester
The Deceivers (Masters novel), a 1952 novel by John Masters 
The Deceivers: Allied Military Deception in the Second World War, a 2010 book by Thaddeus Holt

Film and TV
The Deceiver (1920 film), an American drama film directed by Jean Hersholt and Lewis H. Moomaw
The Deceiver (film), a 1931 film directed by Louis King
The Deceivers (film), a 1988 adventure film starring Pierce Brosnan
Deceiver (film), a 1997 film starring Tim Roth

Music
Deceiver (Chris Thile album)
Deceiver (The Word Alive album)
Deceiver (Muslimgauze album)
Deceiver (DIIV album)
Deceivers (album), a 2022 album by Arch Enemy

Songs
"La engañadora" ("The Deceiver"), a cha-cha-chá written by Enrique Jorrín (1953)
"The Deceiver", a song by The Alarm (1984)
"Deceiver", a song from the album Sad Wings of Destiny by Judas Priest (1976)
"Deceiver", a song from the album Baptized in Filth by Impending Doom (2008)
"Deceiver", a song from the album Indestructible by Disturbed (2008)

Musicians
Deceiver, the former name of the American metal band Believer

Other
The Deceiver (fungus) or Laccaria laccata, a mushroom 
 Buoyant Rook or Deceiver, a shogi opening

See also 
The Great Deceiver (disambiguation)